Tat Ali is a low Holocene shield volcano located in the northern part of the Afar Region of Ethiopia. This elevation is characterized as having an elongated summit depression that has produced a variety of rock types, ranging from basalts to pantellerites. NNW-SSE-trending fissures cutting the volcano have fed basaltic lava flows; those NE of Lake Afrera are of prehistoric date. Late-stage volcanism produced youthful basaltic lava flows on the floor of the summit depression, which is also the site of prominent fumarolic activity.

Tat Ali, Erta Ale, Alu and other Ethiopian highlands are together known as the Danakil Alps.

See also
 List of volcanoes in Ethiopia

References 

 

Mountains of Ethiopia
Shield volcanoes of Ethiopia
Afar Region
Polygenetic shield volcanoes